Yekaterina Kurizhko is a Soviet sprint canoer who competed in the early 1970s. She won two medals at the 1971 ICF Canoe Sprint World Championships in Belgrade with a gold  in the K-4 500 m event and a bronze in the K-2 500 m event.

References

Living people
Soviet female canoeists
Year of birth missing (living people)
ICF Canoe Sprint World Championships medalists in kayak